August Göllerich (2 July 185916 March 1923) was an Austrian pianist, conductor, music educator and music writer. He studied the piano with Franz Liszt, who made him also his secretary and companion on concert tours. Göllerich is known for studying the life and work of Anton Bruckner whose secretary and friend he was. He initiated and conducted concerts of Bruckner's music in Linz, and wrote an influential biography.

Life 
Born in Linz, the son of the Wels town secretary and later member of the Reich Council and State Parliament  and his wife Maria, née Nowotny, Göllerich grew up in middle-class circumstances. His father was a member of a liberal writers and literary association in Wels. Göllerich attended the Linz Realschule, which he completed with the Matura.

He studied mathematics at the University of Vienna, as his father wished. In 1882, he attended the Bayreuth Festival. After his father's death in 1883, he devoted himself entirely to music, studying in Vienna the piano with Toni Raab, and composition with Anton Bruckner. Raab introduced him to Franz Liszt in 1884, who accepted him as a piano student. He recognized Göllerich's literary and pianistic talent, and made him his secretary and travel companion, on concert tours to Germany, Italy and Russia. After Liszt's death in 1886, he worked as a music critic in Vienna.

Göllerich became a secretary of Anton Bruckner. From 1890 until 1896, he was director of the Ramann-Volckmann'sche Musikschule, a music school in Nuremberg, together with his wife Gisela Pászthory-Voigt, also a pianist and student of Liszt. One of her children from an earlier marriage was Casimir von Pászthory.

From 1896 until his death in 1923, Göllerich was director of the Linz Musikverein, which made him also the artistic director of the Musikverein concerts and choir master of the Schubertbund choir. He conducted the world premieres of many important works by Liszt and Bruckner in a series calles Bruckner Festkonzerte, making Linz a leading place for music. Authorized by Bruckner, he wrote a biography of the composer, covering not only his life but also a thorough analysis of his compositions. His work remained an influential biography of the composer, including views regarded later as problematic, such as "Musikant Gottes" (God's musician).

Göllerich died in Linz. The Anton Bruckner Private University holds his diaries, in which his memories of Liszt are recorded, and other materials, which are now in the Austrian National Library in Vienna.

Publications 
 Franz Liszt Berlin 1908
 Anton Bruckner. Ein Lebens- und Schaffensbild. 1936
 The piano master classes of Franz Liszt, 1884-1886 : diary notes of August Göllerich.

Further reading 
 
 Gisela Göllerich (ed.): In Memoriam August Göllerich. Linz 1928
 Wilhelm Jerger: August Göllerichs Wirken für Franz Liszt in Linz.
 Wilhelm Jerger: Vom Musikverein zum Bruckner-Konservatorium 1823-1963, Linz 1963.
 Wilhelm Jerger: August Göllerich, Schüler und Interpret von Franz Liszt. Jahrgang 26, Linz 1972, issue 1/2,
 Wilhelm Jerger: Franz Liszts Klavierunterricht von 1884-1886, dargestellt an den Tagebuchaufzeichnungen von August Göllerich. Regensburg 1975 
 Wilhelm Jerger: August Göllerich. In Friedrich Blume (ed.): Die Musik in Geschichte und Gegenwart. First edition, volume 16, Kassel 1979, column 493
 Stefan Ikarus Kaiser: August Göllerich (1859-1923): Pianist, Dirigent, Musikpädagoge, Musikschriftsteller. Zum 150. Geburtstag einer Linzer Persönlichkeit von internationalem Rang. In: Oberösterreichische Heimatblätter. Jahrgang 63, Linz 2009,

References

Cited sources

External links 

 
 Göllerich, August Austriaforum

1859 births
1923 deaths
Austrian classical pianists
Male classical pianists
Austrian conductors (music)
Austrian music educators
Musicians from Linz
Liszt scholars
19th-century musicologists